The following is a list of United States ambassadors, or other chiefs of mission, to Honduras. The title given by the United States State Department to this position is currently Ambassador Extraordinary and Plenipotentiary.

See also
Honduras – United States relations
Foreign relations of Honduras
Ambassadors of the United States

References

United States Department of State: Background notes on Honduras

External links
 United States Department of State: Chiefs of Mission for Honduras
 United States Department of State: Honduras
 United States Embassy in Tegucigalpa

Honduras
 
United States